Club de Fútbol Gimnástico Alcázar is a Spanish football team based in Alcázar de San Juan, Ciudad Real, in the autonomous community of Castile-La Mancha. Founded in 1972, it plays in Tercera División – Group 18, holding home games at Estadio Municipal de Alcázar, with a capacity of 5,000 seats.

Season to season

28 seasons in Tercera División

Copa del Rey
 

*winner on penalties.

References

External links
Official website 
Futbolme team profile 

Football clubs in Castilla–La Mancha
Association football clubs established in 1972
1972 establishments in Spain
Alcázar de San Juan